Lincoln Conservation Park (formerly Lincoln Conservation Reserve) is a protected area in the Australian state of South Australia located in the Eyre Peninsula in the gazetted locality of Tulka on land in the Section 490 in the cadastral unit of Hundred of Lincoln about  south west of Port Lincoln.

The conservation park was proclaimed on 7 December 2006 under the National Parks and Wildlife Act 1972 for the purpose of recognising ‘its contribution to regional biodiversity conservation’. The proclamation replaced protected area status as a conservation reserve previously declared under the Crown Lands Act 1929 on 11 November 1993 for the purpose of conserving vegetation within the Coffin Bay – Jussieu Peninsula catchment zone.

In 2007, the conservation park was described by its managing authority as follows:The eastern section of the park (sic) consists of undulating limestone plains with low laterite-capped hills, whereas the western section consists of undulating calcarenite plains overlain by sand dunes and coastal dunes or cliffs... Mallee vegetation formations cover most of the park, with Coastal White Mallee being the dominant species. The regionally rare Purple-flowered Mallee community is also conserved within this park (sic).

The conservation park is classified as an IUCN Category VI protected area.

See also
 Protected areas of South Australia
 Lincoln National Park

References

Conservation parks of South Australia
Protected areas established in 1993
1993 establishments in Australia
Eyre Peninsula